Research balloons are balloons that are used for scientific research.  They are usually unmanned, filled with a lighter-than-air gas like helium, and fly at high altitudes.

Meteorology, atmospheric research, astronomy, and military research may be conducted from a research balloon.
Weather balloons are a type of research balloon.  Research balloons usually study a single aspect of science, such as air pollution, air temperature, or wind currents, although sometimes several experiments or equipment are flown together.

Other than weather balloons, few research balloons are launched every year.  This is driven by the large cost of the balloon, the instrument, which is usually custom made, and the cost of the launch.  Because of the altitude reached by most research balloons, the air is too thin and too cold for humans to survive, therefore most research balloons are unmanned and operated remotely.  There have been some balloons equipped with pressurized cabins, beginning with professor Auguste Piccard in the 1930s.

Research balloons are not only used on earth.  With the help of a research balloon, the upper atmosphere of Venus was examined by the Vega program.

See also 
 High-altitude balloon
 Google Balloon Internet
 Columbia Scientific Balloon Facility

External links

 StratoCat - Stratospheric balloons. History and present of their use in the fields of science, military and aerospace

Balloons (aeronautics)
Atmospheric sciences